Melody Francis (born 17 October 1988), is a professional squash player who represents Australia. She reached a career-high world ranking of World No. 34 in January 2012.

References

External links 

Australian female squash players
Living people
1989 births
21st-century Australian women